Art of Fighting are an indie rock band from Melbourne, Australia. They won the ARIA Award for Best Adult Alternative Album in 2001 for their album Wires.

History

1995-2000: Early years and EPs
The band formed in 1995 as a duo, with Ollie Browne playing guitar and Peggy Frew on bass, with both taking turns on vocals. The couple were also in a romantic relationship at this time, though they were to split amicably later.

They were joined six months later by drummer Cameron Grant, and over the following two years released two demo tapes, the first self-titled and the second named The Angry Man. Two of the tracks from the latter, "The Chorus is Suffering" and "You and Me on Mars" were included on the Wonder from a Quarter Acre compilation put out by Au Go Go Records in 1998.

In 1997, the trio began recording The Very Strange Year. During touring for this EP but before its release, Ollie Browne's brother, Miles Browne, joined the group playing guitar and trumpet. The Very Strange Year was released on Half a Cow Records at the end of 1998.

In the middle of 1999 the foursome began recording another EP for Half a Cow, Empty Nights, which was released in November of that year. Cameron Grant left the band in late 2000, being replaced on drums by Marty Brown (also of Sodastream).

2001-2005: Trifekta years
Following a move to Trifekta Records, in March 2001 the band released their debut full-length album, Wires. The album did not chart, but at the ARIA Music Awards of 2001, the album won ARIA Award for Best Adult Alternative Album, beating the more high-profile You Am I, Something for Kate and Magic Dirt. Its release also gave rise to numerous international touring opportunities for the group. In 2021, it was named the 159th greatest Australian album of all time by Rolling Stone Australia.

Their second album, Second Storey, was released in 2004, once again engendering a burst of touring both local and international. In a coup for the band, Bella Union released the album in the UK and Europe.

2006-present: Remote Control Records years
At the end of 2006, the release of first single "Eastbound" preceded a forthcoming album titled Runaways released on 10 March in Australia, on Remote Control Records.  In April 2007 the band played at All Tomorrow's Parties (curated by Dirty Three) in Minehead UK, which was followed by two live shows in Tokyo.

In 2008 the band scored an original soundtrack for the Australian film Ten Empty and in 2010 saw Ollie create a new group called Parallel Lions.

In 2019 the band released the single "Your Love", announced a new album and played concerts in Sydney and Melbourne. Their fourth album, Luna Low, was released in June 2019.

Discography

Albums

EP

Awards and nominations

ARIA Music Awards
The ARIA Music Awards is an annual awards ceremony that recognises excellence, innovation, and achievement across all genres of Australian music. They commenced in 1987.

! 
|-
|2001
| Wires
| ARIA Award for Best Adult Alternative Album
| 
|

Australian Music Prize
The Australian Music Prize (the AMP) is an annual award of $30,000 given to an Australian band or solo artist in recognition of the merit of an album released during the year of award. The commenced in 2005.

|-
| Australian Music Prize 2019
| Luna Low
| Album of the Year
| 
|}

References

External links
 
Article on the production of Second Storey
Article on the making of Runaways
Article on the forthcoming release of Runaways

Victoria (Australia) musical groups
Australian indie rock groups
ARIA Award winners
Bella Union artists